William McArthur may refer to:

William Pope McArthur (1814–1850), US naval officer and hydrologist 
William McArthur (Lord Mayor of London) (1809–1887), Irish businessman, MP and Lord Mayor of London
William Alexander McArthur (1857–1923), British politician
William S. McArthur (born 1951), US astronaut
Sir William MacArthur (British Army officer), Director General Army Medical Services

See also
William Macarthur (1800–1882), Australian horticulturist and politician